, is a Japanese actor represented by STRAIGHT entertainment

Biography
In 2012 he made his debut as an actor portraying Renji Yanagi in Prince of Tennis 2nd season.

In 2014 he portrayed Crow (Makai Knight) in Garo: Makai no Hana。

In 2020, he was cast in Mashin Sentai Kiramager as Shiguru Oshikiri/Kiramai Blue.
。

Filmography

TV dramas

Films

References

External links
 Atomu Mizuishi｜STRAIGHT entertainment
 
 
 
 Atomu Mizuishi at Rotten Tomatoes

21st-century Japanese male actors
1996 births
Living people
People from Kanagawa Prefecture